Paul Leslie Williams (born 25 September 1970) is an English former professional footballer who played as a full-back for Sunderland.

References

1970 births
Living people
Footballers from Liverpool
English footballers
Association football fullbacks
Sunderland A.F.C. players
Swansea City A.F.C. players
Doncaster Rovers F.C. players
English Football League players